LMP1 may refer to:

 Epstein–Barr virus latent membrane protein 1
 GMS Durango LMP1, a Le Mans Prototype built for Durango by GMS in 2000
 Le Mans Prototype, a type of sports prototype race car
 Panoz LMP-1 Roadster-S, a Le Mans Prototype built for Panoz in 1999

See also
LMP (disambiguation)